Rubén Rodríguez  (born 19 April 1967 in Montevideo) is a former Uruguayan footballer.

International career
Rodríguez made one appearance for the senior Uruguay national football team in 1995: on March 22, 1995 in a friendly match against Colombia (2-1 loss) in the Estadio Atanasio Girardot in Medellín. There he saved a 43rd minute penalty kick from Víctor Aristizábal.

References

External links

1967 births
Living people
Association football goalkeepers
Uruguayan footballers
Uruguay international footballers
C.A. Cerro players
Miramar Misiones players
Arsenal de Sarandí footballers
Club Deportivo Palestino footballers
Club Guaraní players
Footballers from Montevideo
Expatriate footballers in Argentina
Expatriate footballers in Chile
Expatriate footballers in Paraguay
Sud América players